Hank Williams The Roy Orbison Way is the fourteenth album recorded by Roy Orbison, and the eighth for MGM Records, released in August 1970. It is a tribute album to the songs of Country Music Hall of Fame honky tonk singer Hank Williams, whom Orbison listed among his influences. The album was recorded in just three sessions in early 1969, and none of its tracks were released as singles.

Recording
The album took a week to make in late February and early March 1969. Orbison previously recorded a cover album of Don Gibson songs three years earlier. The songs came from Orbison's then manager Wesley Rose. The album was released without a single.

Track listing
All tracks composed by Hank Williams, except where indicated.
This album was only released in North America.

Side one
"Kaw-Liga" (Williams, Fred Rose)
"Hey Good Lookin'"
"Jambalaya (On the Bayou)"
"(Last Night) I Heard You Crying in Your Sleep"
"You Win Again"
"Your Cheatin' Heart"

Side two
"Cold, Cold Heart"
"A Mansion on the Hill" (Williams, Rose)
"I Can't Help It (If I'm Still in Love with You)"
"There'll Be No Teardrops Tonight"
"I'm So Lonesome I Could Cry"

Produced by Don Gant
Arranged by Jim Hall

Roy Orbison albums
1970 albums
Albums produced by Don Gant
Hank Williams tribute albums
MGM Records albums